WTKS (1290 kHz, "NewsRadio 97.7 & AM 1290") is a radio station licensed to Savannah, Georgia.  The station is owned by iHeartMedia, Inc., with iHM Licenses, LLC holding the license.   WTKS airs a talk radio format.   Its transmitter is located behind WTKS's studios in Garden City, Georgia (with a Savannah address).

Programming is simulcast on an FM translator station, 97.7 W249BS.  The station uses this FM frequency in calling itself "NewsRadio 97.7 
and AM 1290."

Programming
Weekday mornings begin with "Savannah's News Now" with WTKS news director Bill Edwards and co-anchor Laura Anderson.  The rest of WTKS's weekday schedule features syndicated personalities Rush Limbaugh, Glenn Beck, Dave Ramsey, Mark Levin, Sean Hannity, Coast to Coast AM with George Noory and This Morning, America's First News with Gordon Deal.

Weekends include programs on health, gardening, home repair, golf, law and technology.  Hosts include Bill Handel, Leo Laporte, Gary Sullivan, Ron Wilson and Joe Pags.  Most hours begin with world and national news from Fox News Radio.  Some local news and weather is supplied by CBS-TV Network affiliate WTOC-TV 11.  (WTKS and WTOC-TV had once been co-owned.)

History

Early Years
In October 1929, WTOC signed on as the first broadcasting station in the Savannah area. It was an enterprise of the civic group Junior Board of Trade that was the forerunner of the Savannah Jaycees.  WTOC broadcast on 1260 kilocycles with 500 watts day and night, non-directional. Later, the power increased to 1,000 watts daytime, finally settling on 5,000 watts day and 1,000 watts at night.  With the NARBA nationwide frequency shift in 1941, the station moved to 1290 kHz. Shortly thereafter, a four tower array was built in Garden City, and power increased to 5,000 watts at night using a directional antenna.

WTOC ("Welcome To Our City"), was owned for many years by the Knight Family, with William T. Knight serving as president of the Savannah Broadcasting Company.  It was a CBS affiliate, carrying its schedule of dramas, comedies, news, sports, soap operas, game shows and big band broadcasts during the Golden Age of Radio.

WTOC added an FM station in 1946.  It first broadcast at 97.3 MHz, later moving to 94.1 MHz (today WQBT).  In 1954, Channel 11 WTOC-TV came on the air.  Because WTOC Radio was a longtime CBS affiliate, WTOC-TV also carried CBS TV programming and news.

Switch to MOR
As network programming shifted to television in the 1950s, WTOC became a full service middle of the road (MOR) music station.  WTOC aired many features, both network and local, as well as having significant news programming. It was not until the mid-1970s that WTOC became much more contemporary with its programming. For a while, the station called its sound "The Love Rock," primarily playing what would today be called adult contemporary music.  WTOC used TM's "Sound Of Chicago" jingle package, which had been created for WMAQ.

In the 1960s and early 1970s, WTOC-FM used BPI's beautiful music format.  In the mid-1970s, it switched to BPI's country music format, and became "Country 94."

Great American Country
In 1979, the Knights sold WTOC radio and television to the American Family Group from Columbus, Ohio.  American Family spun the radio stations off to Bluegrass Broadcasting of Lexington, Kentucky. Bluegrass built a large studio-office complex adjacent to the AM transmitter site on Alfred Street, and renamed the AM WWSA ("Working With SAvannah") and the FM became WCHY-FM.  In 1987, the AM switched to the WCHY call letters.  It flipped to classic country music, using the "Great American Country" syndicated service, while the FM continued with contemporary country.

WCHY (AM) and WCHY-FM were sold by Roth Broadcasting in 1995 to WP Radio.  When WP Radio decided to leave broadcasting, it sold the stations to Patterson Broadcasting.  In the late 1990s, WCHY switched to a children's radio format, becoming the Radio Disney affiliate in Savannah.

Talk Radio Format
In 2000, the station was acquired by Clear Channel Communications, a forerunner to current owner iHeartMedia.  Clear Channel flipped the station's format to talk radio.  The Federal Communications Commission assigned the station the WTKS call letters on January 25, 2002.

On March 28, 2011, Clear Channel purchased an FM translator for WTKS, allowing the station to be heard on 97.7 FM as well as 1290 AM.

FM translator

References

External links
FCC History Cards for WTKS
 AM 1290 WTKS official website

TKS
News and talk radio stations in the United States
Chatham County, Georgia
Radio stations established in 1929
IHeartMedia radio stations